Patrick McKenna was an Irish politician and farmer. He was first elected to Dáil Éireann at the 1923 general election as a Farmers' Party Teachta Dála (TD) for the Longford–Westmeath constituency. 

He lost his seat at the June 1927 general election. He left the party in opposition to a voting pact with Cumann na nGaedheal and was an unsuccessful independent candidate at the September 1927 general election.

References

Year of birth missing
Year of death missing
Farmers' Party (Ireland) TDs
Irish farmers
Members of the 4th Dáil